Benue–Congo (sometimes called East Benue–Congo) is a major branch of the Volta-Congo languages which covers most of Sub-Saharan Africa.

Subdivisions
Central Nigerian (or Platoid) contains the Plateau, Jukunoid and Kainji families, and Bantoid–Cross combines the Bantoid and Cross River groups.

Bantoid is only a collective term for every subfamily of Bantoid–Cross except Cross River, and this is no longer seen as forming a valid branch, however one of the subfamilies, Southern Bantoid, is still considered valid. It is Southern Bantoid which contains the Bantu languages, which are spoken across most of Sub-Saharan Africa. This makes Benue–Congo one of the largest subdivisions of the Niger–Congo language family, both in number of languages, of which Ethnologue counts 976 (2017), and in speakers, numbering perhaps 350 million. Benue–Congo also includes a few minor isolates in the Nigeria–Cameroon region, but their exact relationship is uncertain.

The neighbouring Volta–Niger branch of Nigeria and Benin is sometimes called "West Benue–Congo", but it does not form a united branch with Benue–Congo. When Benue–Congo was first proposed by Joseph Greenberg (1963), it included Volta–Niger (as West Benue–Congo); the boundary between Volta–Niger and Kwa has been repeatedly debated. Blench (2012) states that if Benue–Congo is taken to be "the noun-class languages east and north of the Niger", it is likely to be a valid group, though no demonstration of this has been made in print.The branches of the Benue–Congo family are thought to be as follows:
Bantoid–Cross languages
 Cross River
Northern Bantoid
Southern Bantoid
 Central Nigerian languages, also known as Platoid
 Jukunoid
 Kainji
 Plateau

Ukaan is also related to Benue–Congo; Roger Blench suspects it might be either the most divergent (East) Benue–Congo language or the closest relative to Benue–Congo.

Fali of Baissa and Tita are also Benue–Congo but are otherwise unclassified.

Branches and locations (Nigeria)
Below is a list of major Benue–Congo branches and their primary locations (centres of diversity) within Nigeria based on Blench (2019).

Comparative vocabulary
Sample basic vocabulary for reconstructed proto-languages of different Benue-Congo branches:

See also
List of Proto-Benue-Congo reconstructions (Wiktionary)
Systematic graphic of the Niger–Congo languages with numbers of speakers

References 

Wolf, Paul Polydoor de (1971) The Noun Class System of Proto-Benue–Congo (Thesis, Leiden University). The Hague/Paris: Mouton.
Williamson, Kay (1989) 'Benue–Congo Overview', pp. 248–274 in Bendor-Samuel, John & Rhonda L. Hartell (eds.) The Niger–Congo Languages – A classification and description of Africa's largest language family. Lanham, Maryland: University Press of America.

External links 
ComparaLex, database with Benue-Congo word lists
 Web resources for the Benue–Congo languages
 Journal of West African Languages: Benue-Congo
Proto-Benue-Congo Swadesh list (de Wolf 1971)

Niger–Congo languages
 
Volta–Congo languages